ATP-binding cassette, sub-family B member 11 also known as ABCB11 is a protein which in humans is encoded by the  gene.

Function 

The product of the ABCB11 gene is an ABC transporter named BSEP (bile salt export pump), or sPgp (sister of P-glycoprotein). This membrane-associated protein is a member of the superfamily of ATP-binding cassette (ABC) transporters. ABC proteins transport various molecules across extra- and intra-cellular membranes. ABC genes are divided into seven distinct subfamilies (ABC1, MDR/TAP, MRP, ALD, OABP, GCN20, White).

This protein is a member of the MDR/TAP subfamily. Some members of the MDR/TAP subfamily are involved in multidrug resistance. This particular protein is responsible for the transport of taurocholate and other cholate conjugates from hepatocytes (liver cells) to the bile. In humans, the activity of this transporter is the major determinant of bile formation and bile flow.

Clinical significance 

ABCB11 is a gene associated with progressive familial intrahepatic cholestasis type 2 (PFIC2). PFIC2 caused by mutations in the ABCB11 gene increases the risk of hepatocellular carcinoma in early life.

References

Further reading

External links